Edmonton—Wetaskiwin is a federal electoral district in Alberta, Canada, that has been represented in the House of Commons of Canada since 2015.

Edmonton—Wetaskiwin was created by the 2012 federal electoral boundaries redistribution and was legally defined in the 2013 representation order. It came into effect upon the call of the 42nd Canadian federal election, scheduled for 19 October 2015. It was created out of the bulk of Edmonton—Mill Woods—Beaumont, as well as parts of Edmonton—Leduc, Wetaskiwin, and Vegreville—Wainwright.

According to the 2021 census, Edmonton—Wetaskiwin is the most populated riding in Canada, with almost 100,000 residents more than the national average of 109,444. Its population grew at a rate of 89.28% since the 2011 census (on which the 2013 representation order was based).

Demographics
According to the Canada 2016 Census

 Languages: (2016) 76.2% English, 3.0% Tagalog, 2.8% Punjabi, 2.0% French, 1.6% Mandarin, 1.5% German, 1.1% Spanish, 1.1% Cantonese, 1.0% Urdu, 0.9% Gujarati, 0.9% Korean, 0.8% Hindi, 0.6% Arabic

Members of Parliament

This riding has elected the following members of the House of Commons of Canada:

Election results

References

Alberta federal electoral districts
Leduc, Alberta
Politics of Edmonton
Wetaskiwin